"My New Boyfriend" is a song written and performed by American singer-songwriter Carly Simon, and the second single from her 12th studio album Spoiled Girl (1985). 

Simon included the single on her 1995 career retrospective box set Clouds in My Coffee, and Sony BMG/Legacy included it on their 2014 compilation release Playlist: The Very Best of Carly Simon.

Track listing
7" single
 "My New Boyfriend" – 4:19
 "The Wives Are In Connecticut" – 4:28

12" single
 "My New Boyfriend" (Remix) - 5:11
 "My New Boyfriend" (LP Version) - 4:19
 "My New Boyfriend" (Dub Version) - 5:49

Personnel 
 Carly Simon – lead vocals, backing vocals 
 Robbie Kilgore – keyboards, electric guitar 
 Jimmy Bralower – drum programming 
 Andy Goldmark – backing vocals 
 Lucy Simon – backing vocals
 Paul Samwell-Smith – backing vocals 
 Ron Taylor – backing vocals

Music video
Simon released a music video for the single which, in alternating scenes, depicts her in Ancient Egyptian times, in the jungle dancing around a roaring bonfire, and in futuristic times with a robot.

Simon also sang a bit of the song in one of her video blogs posted to her personal YouTube account in 2010.

References

External links
Carly Simon's Official Website

1985 songs
Songs written by Carly Simon
Carly Simon songs
1985 singles
Epic Records singles